Ocaria ocrisia, the black hairstreak or Hewitson's blackstreak, is a butterfly of the family Lycaenidae. It was described by William Chapman Hewitson in 1868. It is found from Mexico to Brazil, Paraguay, Peru, Ecuador and Argentina. It has also been recorded from southern Arizona. The habitat consists of rainforests at altitudes ranging from 200 to 900 meters.

The wingspan is about 27 mm.

References

 Ocaria ocrisia in Butterflies of America catalog

Further reading
 
 
 

Butterflies described in 1868
Eumaeini
Butterflies of North America
Butterflies of Central America
Lycaenidae of South America
Taxa named by William Chapman Hewitson